is a Japanese former professional baseball pitcher. He pitched in Nippon Professional Baseball for the Lotte Orions. In 2004, he was convicted of murder. 

On November 18, 2004, Ogawa murdered a 67-year-old woman named Kazuko Nishiuchi. His uniform number, 26, has been retired since 2005. On September 29, 2005, he was sentenced to life imprisonment at the Saitama District Court.

References

External links 

1962 births
Living people
Japanese baseball players
Baseball people from Tochigi Prefecture
Lotte Orions players
Japanese prisoners sentenced to life imprisonment
Prisoners sentenced to life imprisonment by Japan
Japanese people convicted of murder
People convicted of murder by Japan
Sportspeople convicted of murder
Nippon Professional Baseball pitchers